Slave Unit is the debut studio album of Slave Unit, released in August 1996 by COP International. Reyka Osburn of Tinfed performed live drums on tour and on the album.

Reception
Larry Miles of Black Monday praised the performances and production of Slave Unit and called it "THE electro-punk monster that is the industrial alternative." Sonic Boom was impressed by the band's mix of punk, industrial, and tribal percussion and compared the band favorably to Rage Against the Machine. Fabryka Music Magazine also commended the music's fusion of genres and awarded the album a three out of four, describing it as "simple and concrete."

Track listing

Personnel
Adapted from the Slave Unit liner notes.

Slave Unit
 Torsten Hartwell – bass programming, production
 Rey Osburn – live drums, production
 Mike Paikos – guitar, production
 Alan Sartirana – guitar, production
 Mike Welch – lead vocals, programming, sequencing, percussion, guitar, production

Additional performers
 Maria Azevedo – lead vocals (4)

Production and design
 Robert Bilensky – illustrations
 Shawn Brice – production
 Stefan Noltemeyer – mastering
 Evan Sornstein – design

Release history

References

External links 
 Slave Unit at Bandcamp
 Slave Unit at Discogs (list of releases)

1996 debut albums
Slave Unit albums
COP International albums